
Gmina Chocz is a rural gmina (administrative district) in Pleszew County, Greater Poland Voivodeship, in west-central Poland.

Villages
Gmina Chocz contains the villages and settlements of Brudzewek, Chocz, Józefów, Kuźnia, Kwileń, Niniew, Nowa Kaźmierka, Nowolipsk, Nowy Olesiec, Piła, Stara Kaźmierka and Stary Olesiec.

Neighbouring gminas
Gmina Chocz is bordered by the gminas of Blizanów, Czermin, Gizałki, Grodziec and Pleszew.

References
Polish official population figures 2006

Chocz
Pleszew County